Erez Israeli (born 1974) is an Israeli artist, specializing in Sculpture and Installation Art. Israeli lives and works in Tel Aviv.

Biography 
Israeli graduated from Midrasha Art School of Beit Berl College. He received a post-graduate degree from the Bezalel Academy of Art and Design in 2005. In his works, Israeli emphasizes the idea of preserving Israel identity - collective as well as personal. He thinks about war, terror, religious freedom - the main tensions existing in Israeli society and creates a visual concept around them.

Exhibitions

Solo 

2019 Black Milk, Künstlerhaus Bethanien, Berlin
2017 Die klare Sonne bringt’s an den Tag, Galerie Crone, Vienna
2015 The Difference Between OOOOH and AAAAH, Galerie Crone, Berlin
2014 Firewall Mural, a wall painting project on the Künstlerhaus Bethanien, Berlin
2013 Berlin 2013, Givon Art Gallery, Tel Aviv
2012 Lowland, Givon Art Gallery, Tel Aviv
2012 Erez Israeli – Prints, Tel Aviv Museum of Art
2010 Erez Israeli: Ashpara, Tel Aviv Museum of Art
2009 Friday Night, Givon Art Gallery, Tel Aviv
2007 Love Song, Emergency Exit New Media Center, Haifa Museum of Art
2003 21 Self Exhibitions, Herzliya Museum of Contemporary Art

Group 
Israel Museum

Awards 
2005 Isracard and Tel Aviv Museum of Art Prize for an Israeli Artist
2005 The Rich Foundation Award for Education, Culture and Welfare, Bezalel Academy of Art and Design
2006 Young Artist Award, Ministry of Science, Culture and Sport
2006 The Hadassah and Rafael Klatchkin Prize for Art, America-Israel Cultural Foundation
2007 The Legacy Heritage Fund Prize, Tel Aviv Museum of Art
2009 The Dan Sandel and Sandel Family Foundation Sculpture Award, Tel Aviv Museum of Art

References

External links 
www.erezisraeli.com
Erez Israeli at Givon Gallery

Israeli Jews
1974 births
Living people
Israeli sculptors